"The Wolf and the Seven Young Goats" is a fairy tale collected by the Brothers Grimm and published in Grimm's Fairy Tales (KHM 5). It is of Aarne-Thompson type 123.

The tale has obvious resemblance to "The Three Little Pigs" and other type 124 folktales. The rescue of the kids from the wolf's belly and his punishment by filling him with stones can also been compared to the rescue and revenge of Little Red Cap against the wolf (Aarne-Thompson type 333).

Origin 
The story was published by the Brothers Grimm in the first edition of Kinder- und Hausmärchen in 1812. Their source was the Hassenpflug family from Hanau. A similar tale, The wolf and the kids, has been told in the Middle East and parts of Europe, and probably originated in the first century.

Synopsis
A mother goat leaves her seven children at home while she ventures into the forest to find food. Before she leaves, she warns her young about the wolf who will try to sneak into the house and gobble them up. He will pretend to be their mother and convince the kids to open the door. The young children will be able to recognize their true mother by her white feet and sweet voice.

The mother goat leaves and the seven kids stay in the house. Before long, they hear a voice at the door that says "Let me in children, your mother has something for each and every one of you." It was the wolf, whose gruff voice betrays him and the kids do not let him in. The wolf goes to a marketplace, store, or pharmacy and steals some honey, medicine or chalk, to soften his voice. A little while later, the kids hear another voice at the door: "Let me in children, your mother has something for each and every one of you." This time the voice is high and sweet like their mother's. They are about to let him in when the youngest kid looks under the crack in the door and notices the wolf's big, black feet. They refuse to open the door, and the wolf goes away again.

The wolf goes to the bakery or mill and steals some flour, smearing it all over his coat, turning his black feet white. He returns to the children's house, and says "Let me in children, your mother has something for each and every one of you." The kids see his white feet and hear his sweet voice, so they open the door. The wolf jumps into the house and gobbles up six of the kids. The youngest child hides from the wolf in the grandfather clock and does not get eaten.

Later that day, the mother goat returns home from the forest. She is distraught to find the door wide open and all but one of her children missing. She looks around and sees the wolf, fast asleep under a tree. He has eaten so much, he cannot move. The mother goat calls to her youngest child to quickly get her a pair of scissors, a needle and some thread. She cuts open the wolf's belly and the six children spring out miraculously unharmed. They fill the wolf's belly with rocks, and the mother sews it back up again. When the wolf wakes up, he is very thirsty. He goes to the river to drink, but being so heavy he falls in and drowns under the weight of the rocks. All the children feel great to find themselves safe. The family lives happily ever after.

See also

 Big Bad Wolf
 Little Red Riding Hood
 The Boy Who Cried Wolf
 The Goat and Her Three Kids
 Three Little Pigs

References

External links
(

 

Grimms' Fairy Tales
German fairy tales
Fables
Animal tales
Fiction about goats
Fictional wolves
Wolves in folklore, religion and mythology
Big Bad Wolf
Metaphors referring to wolves
ATU 100-149